Blood and Politics: The History of the White Nationalist Movement from the Margins to the Mainstream is a book by Leonard Zeskind.

Background 
The book discusses figures such as David Duke, Bo Gritz, Pat Robertson, and Willis Carto as well as various movements such as the Christian Identity Movement and the white power skinheads.

The book specifically focuses on Willis Carto, William Luther Pierce, and David Duke.

Reception 
Reviewers considered the book to be one of the most comprehensive and well-researched histories of American white nationalism. For instance, Publishers Weekly called the book a "rigorously researched and eloquent book" that has the "breadth of an encyclopedia." However, the scope of the book was so wide and the contents so exhaustive that critics believed the book was repetitive and unfocused. Art Winslow wrote in the Los Angeles Times that "Zeskind's account is fine-grained, which is both its strength and its weakness." Dave Gilson criticized the book for not making a greater distinction between white Republicans and politically fringe figures and Chris Barsanti said that Zeskind's "style can be tendentious" but that "the weight of his scholarship ... is undeniably impressive."

References 

2009 non-fiction books
English-language books
White nationalism in the United States
Books about race and ethnicity